Magnificent Fiend is the second album by Howlin Rain. It was released in 2008 on the Birdman Records label.

Track listing
 "Requiem" – 0:54
 "Dancers at the End of Time" – 5:56
 "Calling Lightning, Pt.2" – 5:11
 "Lord Have Mercy" – 6:56
 "Nomads" – 5:05
 "El Rey" – 7:08
 "Goodbye Ruby" – 7:51
 "Riverboat" – 6:04

Personnel
 Ethan Miller - Vocals, guitar
 Mike Jackson - Rhythm Guitar
 Ian Gradek - Bass
 Garrett Goddard  - Drums
 Joel Robinow - Keyboard
 Matt Waters  Saxophone
 Scott Knippelmeir - Trombone
 Eli Eckert - Guitar, bass

References

2008 albums
Birdman Records albums
Howlin Rain albums